The Case of the Union of Liberation of Belarus was a political and criminal case initiated by the GPU of the Byelorussian Soviet Socialist Republic against several Belarusian scientists and culture activists. The case formed part of a wave of Soviet repressions in Belarus in 1929 - 1931. The GPU accused the victims of membership in a (presumably non-existent) anti-Soviet organization called the Union of Liberation of Belarus.  Most of the accused were killed, or expelled to far-away regions of the USSR.  

The case started with the arrest of the editor Piotar Iljučonak on February 17, 1930. During the spring and summer of 1930 108 people were arrested. At the beginning the GPU saw Vaclaw Lastowski (former prime minister of the Belarusian People's Republic),  Alaksandar Ćvikievič and Arkadź Smolič (former agriculture minister of the Belarusian People's Republic), as leaders of the organization.  Later Alaksandar Adamovič (a Belarusian nationalist communist politician), Anton Balicki (statesman and writer), Piotar Iljučonak and Dźmitry Pryščepaŭ were viewed as such. People like the prominent poets Janka Kupała and Jakub Kołas or the first president of the Belarusian Science Academy Usievalad Ihnatoŭski were at certain stages accused of being members of the ULB.  

All those arrested, except for 18 people, were sentenced to different terms of deportation. Usievalad Ihnatouski committed suicide on February 4, 1931. The supposed leaders of the ULB were sentenced to 10 years of deportation while most of the other members were deported to inner regions of the USSR for 5 years.  

In 1937—1941 the case was heard again; many of the convicts were executed, some sent to concentration camps. In 1937-1939 many of the GPU executives who had worked on the case were also themselves executed. Another wave of repressions occurred in 1949-1952 against those former ULB membership suspects who were still alive at the time.

List of suspects at the ULB case

References

Sources
 Аркуш А. Рызыкоўная барацьба намэнклятуры // Наша Ніва, No.7.
 Сідарэвіч А. Трыюмвіры, або Помнік камісарам // Наша Ніва, No.13.

See also
Soviet repressions in Belarus
1937 mass execution of Belarusians
1931 Menshevik Trial

1920s in Belarus
1930s in Belarus
Political repression in the Soviet Union
Political and cultural purges
 
1929 in the Soviet Union
1930 in the Soviet Union
1931 in the Soviet Union